Gramapriya is a breed of chicken developed by the Project Directorate on Poultry based in Hyderabad, . The Gramapriya starts laying eggs at an age of 175 days. In 72 weeks a Gramapriya chicken can lay 200–225.

Gramapriya is a crossbred chicken developed by the Indian Government through a  Hyderabad-based project under an All India Co-ordinated Research Project. Gramapriya chickens have been developed for backyard rearing. They have a high favourability rating among farmers in India.

Gramapriya chicken are best suited to preparation of TANDOORI&Grill type dishes.

There are two varieties of Gramapriya:
White variety:- Good egg producer
Coloured variety:- Dual purpose. Egg number is less than white variety->Promising features of Gramapriya are:    =>Multi color feather pattern.  =>Longer shanks.                                            =>Lower predator threat.     =>Moderate in body weight.                                                                                                                                                                                                 =>Better egg production.       =>Produce brown shell eggs.

See also
 List of chicken breeds

References

External links
 Project Directorate on Poultry

Chicken breeds originating in India

.